Therese Kämpfer (born ) is a Swiss wheelchair curler.

Teams

References

External links 

Living people
1958 births
Swiss female curlers
Swiss wheelchair curlers
World wheelchair curling champions
Swiss wheelchair curling champions